Ronald James Barassi (24 October 1913 – 31 July 1941) was an Australian rules footballer who played with Melbourne in the Victorian Football League (VFL). His grandfather came from Italy, and Ron was the father of Hall of Famer Ron Barassi Jr., who was signed to Melbourne under the father–son rule.

Originally from Castlemaine, Barassi was a rover and made his debut for Melbourne in 1936. His final league match was Melbourne's victorious 1940 Grand Final, which he started as the 19th man.

Like many other footballers from the Melbourne Football Club, he joined the army soon after. Serving as part of Australia's campaign in North Africa, he was killed in action at Tobruk in 1941, the first VFL footballer to lose his life in the conflict.

See also
 List of Victorian Football League players who died on active service
 The Rats of Tobruk

Footnotes

References 
Main, J. & Allen, D., "Barassi (snr), Ron", pp. 214–220 in Main, J. & Allen, D., Fallen — The Ultimate Heroes: Footballers Who Never Returned From War, Crown Content, (Melbourne), 2002.

External links

 Australian War Memorial Roll of Honour: Ronald James Barassi (VX45220)
 DemonWiki profile
 Brief profile
 Team photograph Castlemaine v. Maryborough  1932. Barassi second from right, front row

1913 births
1941 deaths
People from Castlemaine, Victoria
Australian rules footballers from Victoria (Australia)
Australian people of Italian descent
Sportspeople of Italian descent
Melbourne Football Club players
Castlemaine Football Club players
Australian Army personnel of World War II
Australian military personnel killed in World War II
Melbourne Football Club Premiership players
One-time VFL/AFL Premiership players
Military personnel from Victoria (Australia)